Mark N Tompkins (born 1954), is an American-born French artist, dancer and choreographer of contemporary dance.

Biography

Trained at the Theatre of Movement and Gesture, Tompkins moved to France in 1973, and discovered the dance with Hideyuki Yano and Elsa Wolliaston. In 1975, he made his first solos in some abandoned locations and worked with Steve Paxton.

In 1983 he founded the company IDA (International Associated Dreams) and won the Bagnolet contest the following year. In 2008, Mark Tompkins received the SEC SACD (Society of Dramatic Authors and Composers) prize for Choreography for all his work.

Choreography

Mark Tompkins' interest in improvisation and real time composition leads him to collaborate through teaching and performing with many dancers, musicians, light designers and video makers. Over the years, his unique way of fabricating unidentified performance objects has become his signature. Tompkins' performances evolve towards musical theater, inspired by popular forms like Music Hall, cabaret and musical comedy.
Some of Mark Tompkins's most notable performances are:

 1976  : Naked Traces
 1978  : Each One's Own
 1981  : Sweet Dreems
 1983  : Empty Holes
 1985 – 1987  : Betrayal
 1988  : Nouvelles for the Avignon Festival, based on the novel IDA by Gertrude Stein
 1992  : Witness, Hommage à Harry Sheppard
 1996  : Gravity
 1996  : Under My Skin, Hommage à Josephine Baker
 1998  : Tributes to Montrose Capital
 2000  : RemiXamor
 2005  : Animal Male
 2007  : Animal Female
 2011  : Black'N'Blues Canaccord

In 2014, Mark Tompkins and Jeremy Wade performed their collaboratively-developed play Stardust in underground theater of the Abrons Arts Center as part of the 2014 Queer New York International Arts Festival.

References

External links
 I.D.A. Mark Tompkins
 Males In Contemporary Ballets

American male dancers
French male dancers
French choreographers
Contemporary dance choreographers
American contemporary dancers
Contemporary dancers
Living people
1954 births